Sofyino is a rural locality (a village) in Beloozersky Selsoviet, Gafuriysky District, Bashkortostan, Russia. The population was 6 as of 2010. There is 1 street.

Geography 
Sofyino is located 37 km northwest of Krasnousolsky (the district's administrative centre) by road. Maly Nagadak is the nearest rural locality.

References 

Rural localities in Gafuriysky District